Lamine Yamal Nasraoui Ebana (born 13 July 2007) is a Spanish professional footballer who plays for FC Barcelona youth team in the División de Honor Juvenil de Fútbol.

Early life 
Born in Mataró, Spain, to a Moroccan father and an Equatorial Guinean mother, Lamine Yamal spent most of his youth in Barcelona.

Club career 
Growing through the youth ranks of La Masia, Lamine Yamal was soon viewed as one of the academy's best prospects.

Whilst added to the Juvenil A team—already above his age grade—for the 2022–23 season, he was selected by Xavi to train with the first team along other youngster in early September 2022. Whilst still yet to sign his first professional contract with the club, he appeared to be one of the academy members to most impress the Catalan coach.

International career 
Lamine Yamal is a youth international for Spain. In 2021, he played 4 games and scored 1 goal for Spain Under-16s.

In 2022 he also played with the Under-15, with whom he proved to be a prolific goalscorer.

Style of play 
A left-footed forward with great dribbling, passing and scoring abilities, he is able to play both as a centre-forward, an attacking midfielder or a winger, mostly on the right flank.

With his technical profile, he was soon compared to Argentinian idol Lionel Messi, like many La Masia trainee before him, but also to more recent Barça star Ansu Fati.

References

External links 

 

2007 births
Living people
Spanish footballers
Footballers from Catalonia
Spanish sportspeople of Equatoguinean descent
Spanish sportspeople of Moroccan descent
Spain youth international footballers
Association football forwards
People from Mataró